Shirley Scott & the Soul Saxes is an album by organist Shirley Scott recorded in 1969 and released on the Atlantic label.

Reception
The Allmusic site awarded the album 4½ stars stating "One of Scott's best albums, Shirley Scott and the Soul Saxes finds the organist on a 1969 set of mostly soul covers. This was one of her few dates for the soul-heavy Atlantic label, but it certainly qualifies as a standout in the entire soul-jazz catalog".

Track listing 
 "It's Your Thing" (O'Kelly Isley, Jr., Ronald Isley, Rudolph Isley) - 4:30   
 "(You Make Me Feel Like) A Natural Woman" (Gerry Goffin, Carole King, Jerry Wexler) - 4:20   
 "I Wish I Knew How It Would Feel to Be Free" (Dick Dallas, Billy Taylor) - 6:24   
 "You" (Jack Goga, Ivy Jo Hunter, Jeffrey Owen) - 5:42   
 "Stand by Me" (Ben E. King, Jerry Leiber, Mike Stoller) - 4:04   
 "Get Back" (John Lennon, Paul McCartney) - 4:46   
 "More Today Than Yesterday" (Pat Upton) - 3:39  
Recorded at Atlantic Studios in New York City on September 10, 1968 (track 3) and at Regent Sound Studios in New York City on July 9 (tracks 1, 4 & 5) and July 10 (tracks 2, 6 & 7), 1969

Personnel 
 Shirley Scott - organ
 Ernie Royal - trumpet (tracks 1, 2 & 4-7)
 King Curtis, David Newman - flute, tenor saxophone (tracks 1, 2 & 4-7)
 Hank Crawford - alto saxophone, baritone saxophone (tracks 1, 2 & 4-7)
 Richard Tee - piano (tracks 1, 2 & 4-7)
 Eric Gale - guitar 
 Jerry Jemmott (track 3), Chuck Rainey (tracks 1, 2 & 4-7) - electric bass
 Jimmy Johnson (tracks 2, 6 & 7), Bernard Purdie (tracks 1 & 3-5) - drums
 Marty Sheller - arranger, conductor (tracks 1, 2 & 4-7)

References 

1969 albums
Albums produced by Joel Dorn
Atlantic Records albums
Shirley Scott albums